General elections are scheduled to be held in Denmark no later than 31 October 2026, according to § 32 in the constitution, which defines an election cycle as four years. All 179 seats in the Folketing will be up for election, 175 in Denmark proper, two in Greenland and two in the Faroe Islands.

Background
The previous general elections in 2022 were held on 31 October in the Faroe Islands and on 1 November in Denmark and Greenland. The elections led to a narrow victory for the red bloc. Following the election, a centrist government led by Prime Minister Mette Frederiksen and consisting of the Social Democrats (A), Venstre (V), and the Moderates (M) was established.

Opinion polls

Notes

References

Denmark
Denmark
Elections in Denmark
Elections in the Faroe Islands
Elections in Greenland